Colón Partido is a partido on the northern border of Buenos Aires Province in Argentina.

Settlements

Colón
Pearson
Sarasa
Villa Manuel Pomar

External links
 Colón Website
 Provincial Website 

1892 establishments in Argentina
Partidos of Buenos Aires Province